The 1999 Ole Miss Rebels football team represented the University of Mississippi during the 1999 NCAA Division I-A football season.  They participated as members of the Southeastern Conference in the West Division.  Coached by David Cutcliffe, the Rebels played their home games at Vaught–Hemingway Stadium in Oxford, Mississippi.

Schedule

Roster
RB Deuce McAllister, Jr.

References

Ole Miss
Ole Miss Rebels football seasons
Independence Bowl champion seasons
Ole Miss Rebels football